Dwina (or Dwyna) was launched at Kingston upon Hull in 1792. She primarily traded between  Hull and Baltic ports, though she did make some voyages to the Mediterranean. In 1802 she became a whaler in the northern whale fishery. She made two complete voyages; ice wrecked her in 1804 shortly after she arrived at Greenland on her third voyage.

Career
Dwina first appeared in Lloyd's Register (LR) in 1792.

The whaling data below is from Coltish, augmented with press reports. 

After her second whaling voyage, Captain Mitchinson sailed Dwina to Petersburg and back to Hull.

Fate
Dwina was lost at Greenland on 14 April 1804. Her crew was saved.

Dwina was the only Hull whaler lost in the season. The other forty or so had a successful whaling season, with some gathering up to 19 whales. The season was one of the most successful in memory.

Citations

References

 
 

1792 ships
Ships built in Kingston upon Hull
Age of Sail merchant ships of England
Whaling ships
Maritime incidents in 1804